Souleymane Anne (born 5 December 1997) is a footballer who plays as a forward for the Belgian club Virton and the Mauritania national football team.

Anne began his early footballing career in the lower tiers of France, and was a prolific goalscorer at SMOC, Saran, Angoulême, and finally Aurillac Arpajon.

International career
Born in France, Anne is of Mauritanian descent. Anne made his professional debut for the Mauritania national football team in a friendly 3-1 loss to Ghana on 26 March 2019.

He played for the national team at the African Cup of Nations 2019, the first international tournament of the team

References

External links
 
 Foot-National Profile
 

1997 births
Living people
Footballers from Orléans
Citizens of Mauritania through descent
Mauritanian footballers
Mauritania international footballers
Mauritanian expatriate footballers
French footballers
French sportspeople of Mauritanian descent
Angoulême Charente FC players
ÉFC Fréjus Saint-Raphaël players
C.D. Tondela players
Championnat National 2 players
Championnat National 3 players
Primeira Liga players
Association football forwards
2019 Africa Cup of Nations players
Expatriate footballers in Portugal
Mauritanian expatriates in Portugal
USM Saran players